Lewsey Brook is a minor tributary of the River Lea. Lewsey Brook is a temporal water course, supplied by surface water from farmland and the nearby Luton suburbs of Lewsey, Lewsey Farm, and Lewsey Park, that enters the channel through a culvert. During periods of heavy rain, water floods areas of the nearby Lewsey Park.

Lewsey Brook enters the River Lea via Knapps Brook at Toddington Road in Leagrave village. The brook is most easily viewed Lewsey Park in Luton.

References

Rivers of Bedfordshire
Tributaries of the River Lea
Luton
1Lewsey